Philip Francis Anthony Maloney (October 6, 1927 – February 21, 2020) was a Canadian professional ice hockey player and coach. He played in the [[National Hockey League (NHL) with the Boston Bruins, Toronto Maple Leafs, and Chicago Black Hawks between 1949 and 1960. The rest of his career, which lasted from 1946 to 1970, was spent in various minor leagues, mainly with the Vancouver Canucks of the Western Hockey League. After retiring he turned to coaching, and coached the Vancouver Canucks of the NHL from 1974 to 1977. He also served as the general manager of the Canucks from 1974 to 1976.

Playing career
Maloney began his career with the Shawinigan Cataractes before signing a free agent contract with the Boston Bruins in 1948. Sent to the American Hockey League's Hershey Bears, he finished with 79 points in his first professional campaign. The next year, he earned a spot on the Bruins' National Hockey League roster and tallied 46 points (15 goals, 31 assists) in 70 games. As a result, he finished second for the 1949-50 Calder Memorial Trophy vote for rookie of the year. He played thirteen games with the Bruins the next season before being traded to the Toronto Maple Leafs. Maloney played 29 games with the Leafs in 1952-53. He later made NHL appearances with the Chicago Black Hawks, playing 45 games between 1958 and 1960.

Maloney spent 14 years with the Vancouver Canucks in the Western Hockey League. He retired at the end of the 1969-70 season, the year before the Canucks became a part of the NHL, and was the career scoring leader for the franchise with 923 points. He scored a career high 102 points in 1960-61 during a two-year stint with the Buffalo Bisons. Maloney later was hired as an assistant coach by the NHL's Vancouver Canucks. He became the head coach late in the 1973-74 season and coached 37 games with the franchise. In 1974-75, he coached the team to a first-place finish in the Smythe Division and to the first playoff appearance in its history.

Maloney died on February 21, 2020, aged 92.

Career statistics

Regular season and playoffs

Coaching record

References

External links

1927 births
2020 deaths
Boston Bruins players
Buffalo Bisons (AHL) players
Canadian ice hockey centres
Canadian ice hockey coaches
Chicago Blackhawks players
Hershey Bears players
Ice hockey people from Ottawa
Ottawa Senators (QSHL) players
Shawinigan-Falls Cataracts (QSHL) players
Pittsburgh Hornets players
Toronto Maple Leafs players
Vancouver Canucks (WHL) players
Vancouver Canucks coaches
Vancouver Canucks general managers